Elizabeth Coulson (born September 8, 1954) is a former Republican member of the Illinois House of Representatives, representing the 17th district from 1997 to 2011.

Personal background
Born in Hastings, Nebraska, Coulson received a B.S. in education from the University of Kansas in 1976, an ACPT in Physical Therapy from the Northwestern University Medical School in 1977 and an MBA from the Keller Graduate School of Management of DeVry University in 1985. From 1981 until 2002, she was an Associate Professor in the Department of Physical Therapy at the Chicago Medical School and rose to become the department chair. Coulson also received an ABD in Health Policy and Administration from the University of Illinois in 2004.

Political career
Coulson was elected to the Illinois House of Representatives  in 1996. She succeeded Gregg Goslin who was appointed as a caretaker after Kevin Hanrahan resigned during his first term. She ran for the Illinois's 10th congressional district seat being vacated by Mark Kirk, but lost to Bob Dold in the February 2nd, 2010, primary election. She backed Republican candidate Hamilton Chang, in his unsuccessful bid to replace her in the Illinois House of Representatives in the 17th district. On March 5, 2021, Governor J.B. Pritzker appointed Coulson to the Illinois Human Rights Commission for a term ending January 16, 2025. As of June 16, 2021, her appointment is awaiting confirmation by the Illinois Senate.

References

External links
Illinois General Assembly - Representative Elizabeth Coulson (R) 17th District official IL House website
Bills Committees
2006 2004 2002 2000 1998 1996 campaign contributions

1954 births
Living people
Republican Party members of the Illinois House of Representatives
Women state legislators in Illinois
21st-century American politicians
21st-century American women politicians